Osredci may refer to:

Osredci, Serbia, a village near Brus
Osredci, Croatia, a village near Gračac

See also
Osredak (disambiguation)